FK Vajnory is a Slovak association football club located in Vajnory. It currently plays in 3. Liga (Bratislava) (3rd level).

References

External links
Official website 
Futbalnet profile 

Football clubs in Slovakia
Association football clubs established in 1933
1933 establishments in Czechoslovakia